Maria Paula Gonçalves da Silva (born March 11, 1962 in Osvaldo Cruz, São Paulo), nicknamed "Magic Paula", is a retired Brazilian women's basketball player. She is considered one of the greatest players in her country, along with Hortência Marcari and Janeth Arcain. For Brazil women's national basketball team, Paula is the second biggest scorer with 723 points (behind Hortência) and holds the record for caps with 45 games, being in two Olympic Games and six World Championships.

Paula became a member of the Women's Basketball Hall of Fame in 2006 and of the FIBA Hall of Fame in 2013.

Career
Paula begun playing basketball at the age of ten, and in 1974, was invited to join Assis Tênis Clube. One year and a half later, the team folded and Paula went to Jundiaí to play for Colégio Divino Salvador, and a few months later, was drafted for the first time by the national team despite being only fourteen. In 1988, Paula went to play in Spain, but an injured knee and difficulties of adaptation brought her back to Brazil in 1991.

In 1979, she helped her team to a fourth place at the Pan American Games, held in Puerto Rico. During the 1983 World Championship hosted by Brazil, reporter Juarez Araújo compared Paula's play to Magic Johnson, leading to her long-lasting nickname of "Magic Paula". That same year, Paula and the national team improved their previous Pan American performance by winning a bronze medal at the Venezuela games, and, in 1987, went yet one more step further by winning a silver medal at the 1987 Indianapolis Pan Americans. In 1991, Paula and the Brazilian women's national basketball team won the gold medal at that year's Pan American tournament, held in Cuba, being the player which most impressed Cuban president Fidel Castro.

In 1992, Paula helped her team qualify for the Olympic Games for the first time. Brazil finished in seventh place at the Barcelona Olympics.

In 1993, Paula went to Associação Atlética Ponte Preta, where she played along with Hortência and won the World Championship for clubs. After discussions with Hortência, Paula returned to Piracicaba.

In 1994, Paula won the women's world basketball championship in Australia, making Brazil the only country other than the Soviet Union or the United States to win the title (Australia became the fourth in 2006), and was named the most valuable player of that tournament. In 1996, she won a silver medal at the Atlanta Olympics, and retired from the national team after winning the 1997 FIBA Americas Championship for Women. She still played for clubs before retiring in 2000.

After retirement, Paula became an entrepreneur, director of the Centro Olímpico do Ibirapuera, and worked for a while in the Brazilian Ministry of Sports. She also commented the basketball tournaments of the 2011 Pan American Games and 2012 Summer Olympics for Rede Record, the NBA playoffs and All-Star Game for Space in 2014 and 2015, and the 2016 Summer Olympics for ESPN Brasil.

See also
 Basketball in South America

References

External links
 Official website
 Paula at the Brazilian Confederation website
 

1962 births
Living people
Basketball players at the 1992 Summer Olympics
Basketball players at the 1996 Summer Olympics
Brazilian expatriate basketball people in Spain
Brazilian women's basketball players
FIBA Hall of Fame inductees
Olympic basketball players of Brazil
Olympic medalists in basketball
Olympic silver medalists for Brazil
Sportspeople from São Paulo (state)
Medalists at the 1996 Summer Olympics
Pan American Games gold medalists for Brazil
Pan American Games silver medalists for Brazil
Pan American Games bronze medalists for Brazil
Pan American Games medalists in basketball
Basketball players at the 1983 Pan American Games
Basketball players at the 1987 Pan American Games
Basketball players at the 1991 Pan American Games
Medalists at the 1983 Pan American Games
Medalists at the 1987 Pan American Games
Medalists at the 1991 Pan American Games